Thomas Meagher may refer to:

 Thomas Meagher (merchant) (c 1764–1837) Irish emigrant to Newfoundland, merchant and ship-owner
 Thomas Meagher (MP) (1796–1874), Irish businessman and politician, Mayor of Waterford and MP for Waterford 1847–57
 Thomas Francis Meagher (1823–1867), leader of the Young Irelanders in the 1848 Rebellion, acting Governor of the Montana Territory
 Thomas William Meagher (1902–1979) Australian medical practitioner, Lord Mayor of Perth, Western Australia

See also 
 Meagher (surname)